The 2019–20 Dartmouth Big Green Men's ice hockey season was the 114th season of play for the program and the 59th season in the ECAC Hockey conference. The Big Green represented the Dartmouth College and were coached by Bob Gaudet, in his 23rd season as their head coach. After the season Gaudet announced his retirement.

Departures

Recruiting

Roster

As of November 26, 2019.

Standings

Schedule and Results

|-
!colspan=12 style=";" | Exhibition

|-
!colspan=12 style=";" | Regular Season

|-
!colspan=12 style=";" | 

|-
!colspan=12 style=";" | 

|- align="center" bgcolor="#e0e0e0"
|colspan=12|Dartmouth Lost Series 0–2

Scoring statistics

Goaltending statistics

Rankings

References

Dartmouth Big Green men's ice hockey seasons
Dartmouth Big Green
Dartmouth Big Green
2019 in sports in New Hampshire
2020 in sports in New Hampshire